The Daihatsu P-5 was a sports racing car built by Daihatsu in 1967. It was an evolution of the P-3, and featured a 1.3-litre twin-cam straight-four engine capable of producing around about 130-140 PS.

History

The P-5 was an updated version of the P-3, but featured a bigger 1.3-litre straight-four engine, fitted in the rear of the car. It was shown at the 14th Tokyo Motor Show in October 1967 as the Daihatsu P-5X.

Two P-5s were entered in the Japanese Grand Prix in 1967. It was entered in the 1000 km of Suzuka in 1968, finishing third. It was then run in the Japanese Grand Prix again, which was held at Fuji Speedway; the No.15 car won its class, and finished tenth overall. Toyota bought Daihatsu in 1969, but the car was used one last time; it finished second in the 1000 km of Suzuka that year.

References

Sports racing cars
P-5